The Crescendo was a West Hollywood jazz venue located at 8572 Sunset Boulevard. It opened in 1954, along with the Interlude upstairs, and ran until 1964.

History 
The Crescendo was owned and operated by Gene Norman (né Eugene Abraham Nabatoff; 1922–2015) of GNP Crescendo Records who had purchased the property in 1954 from singer Billy Eckstine who had run the venue as the Chanticlair. The Chanticlair, Crescendo, and Interlude welcomed integrated audiences. Norman sold the Crescendo in 1963 to focus on GNP Crescendo Records, and in 1965, the club became The Trip.

Performers 
Performers at the Crescendo included:

 Herb Alpert and the Tijuana Brass
 Louie Armstrong
 Count Basie
 Oscar Brown, Jr.
 Eddie Cano
 June Christy
 Sam Cooke
 Joey Dee & the Starliters
 Billy Eckstine
 Duke Ellington
 Ella Fitzgerald
 Dizzy Gillespie
 Chico Hamilton
 Billie Holiday
 Harry James
 Louis Jordan
 Stan Kenton
 Perez Prado
 Machito
 Herbie Mann
 Shelly Manne
 Gerry Mulligan
 Anita O'Day
 Perez Prado
 George Shearing
 Nina Simone
 Art Tatum
 Cal Tjader
 Mel Torme
 Sarah Vaughan

Folk music was represented with appearances by:

 The Limeliters
 Joe & Eddie
 Theodore Bikel
 Chad Mitchell
 Jim McGuinn

The club also headlined comics including:

 Woody Allen
 Shelley Berman
 Lenny Bruce
 Lord Buckley
 Bill Cosby
 Redd Foxx
 Dick Gregory
 Tom Lehrer
 Bob Newhart
 Don Rickles
 Mort Sahl
 Jonathan Winters

Selected recordings at the Crescendo

Notes

References 
 

Jazz clubs in Los Angeles
1954 establishments in California
1964 disestablishments in California
Defunct jazz clubs in California